Clive Holden is a Canadian new media artist, filmmaker and poet from Victoria, British Columbia, he is currently living in Toronto with his wife, writer Alissa York.

New Media
In the inaugural exhibition in 2013 of UNAMERICAN UNFAMOUS at the Ryerson Image Centre, Holden worked with archival photographs and snap shots submitted by the public via social media, along with pulsating film leader loops in a large-scale wall composition. The public was asked to nominate their "favourite unfamous unAmericans" for inclusion. The media were composed using a musical analogy so the visuals were listened to rather than viewed. Hundreds of randomization algorithms were also included in the work's code, so that the work's creation wasn't completed until the moment it was viewed, and it could never be viewed the same way twice. [citations needed]

Media, Mediated (2013) is an ongoing series of new media works, net art works, and chromogenic prints. They interrelate in spite of their disparate natures as either ephemeral time-based net art works and installations, or more traditional art objects. Their juxtapositions highlight what they have in common as well as their differences.[citations needed]

Trains of Winnipeg
Holden's best-known and publicized project to date is the award-winning "film poem" series Trains of Winnipeg, a collection of 14 short films featuring Holden's poetry with musical accompaniment by Christine Fellows, John K. Samson, Jason Tait, Steve Bates and Emily Goodden. Trains of Winnipeg screened internationally, a.o. at the IFFR. In it is included the haunting short, 18000 Dead in Gordon Head, in which Holden recalls the shooting of a young girl in that part of Victoria.  The 18,000 in the title refers to the average number of murders a television viewer has seen by the time they reach the age of sixteen years.

Utopia Suite
Currently he is working on his project Utopia Suite, launched at the Holland Festival in Amsterdam (2006), investigating into 21st-century views on utopianism. Utopia Suite has since been touring art-galleries through Canada. Recent works, UNAMERICAN UNFAMOUS and Media, Mediated are parts of the Utopia Suite project.

References

External links
 Clive Holden
 Trains of Winnipeg

20th-century Canadian poets
Canadian male poets
21st-century Canadian poets
Living people
Canadian multimedia artists
Artists from Victoria, British Columbia
Writers from Victoria, British Columbia
20th-century Canadian male writers
21st-century Canadian male writers
Year of birth missing (living people)